Stir Crazy Thane is an oriental restaurant based in Thane, India at Viviana Mall, founded by hotelier Rohit Narang of Mars Group in collaboration with Master Chef Sanjeev Kapoor.

Apart from the interiors and menu, the USP of the restaurant is their marketplace concept, where they can choose from 140 ingredient options and hand them over to the wok chefs for their mix. The Restaurant Claims to have no connection with Stir Crazy Chicago/

High-profile figures attending on its first night include Tele Actor Vishal Singh, Actress Shilpa Sakhlani, Director Ankush Mohla, Actress Smita Bansal, and also actress and astrologer Munisha Khatwani.

References

Thane
Restaurants in India
Theme restaurants
Restaurant chains in India
Restaurants established in 2011
2011 establishments in Maharashtra